Chapparapadavu is a Grama panchayat in Kannur district in the Indian state of Kerala. Chapparapadavu Panchayat have administration over the villages of Kooveri, Thimiri and Vellad.

Demographics
As of 2011 Census, Chapparapadavu Grama Panchayat had a population of 31,622 among which 15,322 are males and 16,300 females. In Chapparapadavu Panchayat, 10.9% of the population was under 6 years of age. Chapparapadavu Panchayat had an average literacy of 92.8% lower than the state average of 94%.

Administration
Chapparapadavu Grama Panchayat is part of Taliparamba (State Assembly constituency) in Kannur Loksabha constituency.

Transportation
Chapparappadavu is located at 14 km northeast of Taliparamba town. The national highway passes through Taliparamba. Goa and Mumbai can be accessed on the northern side and Cochin and Thiruvananthapuram can be accessed on the southern side.  Taliparamba has a good bus station and buses are easily available to all parts of Kannur district.  The road from Taliparamba to the east of Iritty connects to Mysore and Bangalore but buses to these cities are available only from Kannur, 22 km to the south. The nearest railway stations are Kannapuram and Kannur on Mangalore-Palakkad line. 
Trains are available to almost all parts of India.  There are airports at Kannur, Mangalore and Calicut. All of them are small international airports with direct flights available only to Middle Eastern countries.

See also

 Kooveri
 Padapengad
 Thiruvettoor

Image gallery

References

Villages near Taliparamba